Raven & Rose was a restaurant in Portland, Oregon, with an upstairs cocktail bar called The Rookery. Both were housed in the Ladd Carriage House.

Description
The "British Isles-inspired" and "Irish-influenced" restaurant Raven & Rose was housed in the Ladd Carriage House along Southwest Broadway in downtown Portland, along with an upstairs cocktail bar called The Rookery.

History
Dave Shenaut became bar director in 2012 and continued to hold the position, as of 2015. Raven & Rose owner Lisa Mygrant confirmed the hiring of Daniel Mondok as executive chef in January 2016.

The restaurant and bar were forced to close temporarily during the COVID-19 pandemic. As of March 14, 2020, Raven & Rose planned to operate a takeout service and offer a special menu for St. Patrick's Day.

The restaurant had closed permanently by November 2021.

See also
 List of Irish themed restaurants

References

External links

 

2020s disestablishments in Oregon
Defunct European restaurants in Portland, Oregon
Irish restaurants in the United States
Southwest Portland, Oregon